Hosby may refer to several places in Estonia:

Hosby, Noarootsi Parish, village in Noarootsi Parish, Lääne County
Hosby, Vormsi Parish, village in Vormsi Parish, Lääne County